The Committee on Agriculture and Rural Development (AGRI) is a committee of the European Parliament.

Responsibilities of the Committee
AGRI is the European Parliament committee responsible for:

The operation and development of the Common Agricultural Policy
Rural development (including the activities of the relevant financial instruments)
Legislation on:
Veterinary and plant-health matters, animal feedingstuffs provided such measures are not intended to protect against risks to human health
Animal husbandry and welfare
Improvements in the quality of agricultural products
Supplies of raw materials for agriculture
The Community Plant Variety Office
Forestry

Members, 8th Parliament

Those members listed as United Kingdom members are no longer members of the Committee.

Research service 
The Committee is directly supported by a research service, the Policy Department for Structural and Cohesion Policies. Most of its research studies and briefings are published online. The research reports do not necessarily reflect the view of the Committee.

Recent publications (as of September 2018):

Towards the Common Agricultural Policy beyond 2020: comparing the reform package with the current regulations

The revival of wolves and other large predators and its impact on farmers and their livelihood in rural regions of Europe

Agricultural trade: assessing reciprocity of standards

Urban and Peri-urban Agriculture in the EU

Towards the CAP post 2020 – Appraisal of the EC Communication on ‘The Future of Food and Farming’ of 29 November 2017

#FutureofCAP

Implications of ‘Brexit’ for the EU agri-food sector and the CAP: budgetary, trade and institutional issues

EU – UK agricultural trade: state of play and possible impacts of Brexit

Possible transitional arrangements related to agriculture in the light of the future EU – UK relationship: institutional issues

Young farmers – Policy implementation after the 2013 CAP reform

The Consequences of Climate Change for EU Agriculture: Follow-Up to the COP21 UN Paris Climate Change Conference

The EU Cattle Sector: Challenges and Opportunities – Milk and Meat

Policy support for productivity vs.sustainability in EU agriculture: Towards viable farming and green growth

CAP implementation: Flexibility given to Member States – state of play and perspectives

Preserving agricultural soils in the EU

The service also publishes a regular current awareness bulletin on research, documents and news in the fields of agriculture and rural development, titled 'Research for AGRI : News'. Recent editions can be found here on the 'Research for AGRI Committee' site.

See also
 Agriculture and Fisheries Council (Council of the European Union)
 Directorate-General for Agriculture, Fisheries, Social Affairs and Health
 European Commissioner for Agriculture and Rural Development
 Directorate-General for Agriculture and Rural Development

References

External links
Official Homepage
Research for AGRI Committee

Agriculture
Agriculture in Europe